National Development Council of Rwanda (French: Conseil national de développement) was the unicameral legislature of Rwanda from 1982 to 1994. Members were elected for five-year terms by universal suffrage.

It had 70 members elected by voters from 140 candidates nominated by the MRND, and it exercised legislation on its own. Last elections were held in 1988.

Speakers

Elections
1981 Rwandan parliamentary election
1983 Rwandan parliamentary election
1988 Rwandan parliamentary election

See also
Politics of Rwanda
History of Rwanda

Sources

Parliament of Rwanda
Government of Rwanda
Rwanda
Rwanda
1982 establishments in Rwanda
1994 disestablishments in Rwanda